Exocet is a type of anti-ship missile. Exocet may also mean:
In older English literature there are some uses of "exocet" to mean "flying fish"
Exocet (typeface) is a typeface
Exocet (car) is a kit car produced by MEV Ltd
Ellyas Pical (boxer) is nicknamed "the Exocet" referring to his strong left hand compared to the missile popular at his era

In biology 
Biological names for flying-fish:
Exocoetus
Exocoetidae

See also
XOC or xoc
An exosuit is a powered exoskeleton